A lactam is a cyclic amide, formally derived from an amino alkanoic acid. The term is a portmanteau of the words lactone + amide.

Nomenclature
Greek prefixes in alphabetical order indicate ring size:

 α-Lactam (3-atom rings)
 β-Lactam (4-atom rings)
 γ-Lactam (5-atom rings)
 δ-Lactam (6-atom rings)
 ε-Lactam (7-atom rings)

This ring-size nomenclature stems from the fact that a hydrolyzed α-Lactam leads to an α-amino acid and a β-Lactam to a β-amino acid, etc.

Synthesis
General synthetic methods exist for the organic synthesis of lactams.

Beckmann rearrangement
Lactams form by the acid-catalyzed rearrangement of oximes in the Beckmann rearrangement.

Schmidt reaction
Lactams form from cyclic ketones and hydrazoic acid in the Schmidt reaction.

Cyclization of amino acids
Lactams can be formed from cyclisation of amino acids via the coupling between an amine and a carboxylic acid within the same molecule.
Lactamization is most efficient in this way if the product is a γ-lactam. For example, Fmoc-Dab(Mtt)-OH, although its side-chain amine is sterically protected by extremely bulky 4-Methyltrityl (Mtt) group, the amine can still intramolecularly couple with the carboxylic acid to form a γ-lactam. This reaction almost finished within 5 minutes with many coupling reagents (e.g. HATU and PyAOP).

Intramolecular nucleophilic subsitution
Lactams form from intramolecular attack of linear acyl derivatives from the nucleophilic abstraction reaction.

Iodolactamization
An iminium ion reacts with a halonium ion formed in situ by reaction of an alkene with iodine.

Kinugasa reaction
Lactams form by copper-catalyzed 1,3-dipolar cycloaddition of alkynes and nitrones in the Kinugasa reaction

Diels-Alder reaction
Diels-Alder reaction between cyclopentadiene and chlorosulfonyl isocyanate (CSI) can be utilized to obtain both β- as well as γ-lactam. At lower temp (−78 °C), β-lactam is the preferred product. At optimum temperatures, a highly useful γ-lactam known as Vince Lactam is obtained.

Tautomerization to lactims
A lactim is a cyclic carboximidic acid compound characterized by an endocyclic carbon-nitrogen double bond. They are formed when lactams undergo tautomerization.

Reactions
 Lactams can polymerize to polyamides.

See also 
 Lactone, a cyclic ester.
 β-Lactam
 β-Lactam antibiotics, which includes penicillins
 2-Pyrrolidone
 2-Piperidinone
 Caprolactam

References

External links

Functional groups